Oakley is a village and former civil parish in the north of the English county of Suffolk. In 1961 the parish had a population of 204. The village is in the parish of Brome and Oakley and has been combined with the village of Brome for centuries but the civil parish was only combined in 1982.

The village church is dedicated to St Nicholas. It is a Grade II* listed building dating from the 14th century.

References

Villages in Suffolk
Former civil parishes in Suffolk
Mid Suffolk District